Estación Rincón or Rincón is a village in the Treinta y Tres Department of Uruguay.

Geography
The main part of the town is located between Ruta 18 and the railroad tracks, where there is the station which gives its name to the town. A smaller part is located southeast of the tracks. It is the main town of Costas del Tacuarí, one of the main rice producing areas of Uruguay.

History
On 9 December 1985, its status was elevated to "Pueblo" (village) by the Act of Ley Nº 15.788.

Population
In 2011 Estación Rincón had a population of 674.
 
Source: Instituto Nacional de Estadística de Uruguay

References

External links
INE map of Estación Rincón

Populated places in the Treinta y Tres Department